Mangala is the name for Mars in Hindu astrology.
Mangala may also refer to:
 Mangala (game), a traditional Turkish mancala game
 Mangala (magazine), a weekly Kannada film magazine
 Mangala (film), a Hindi-Telugu bilingual film
 Mangala language (disambiguation)
 Mangala people, an Indigenous Australian people of Western Australia
 the Hindu deity Mangala; see Maa Mangala Temple, Kakatpur, India
 Maṅgala Buddha
 Maṅgala Sutta

People 
 Eliaquim Mangala (born 1991), French footballer
 Mangala Moonesinghe (1931–2016), Sri Lankan lawyer, politician, and diplomat
 Mangala Samaraweera (born 1956), Sri Lankan politician
 Orel Mangala (born 1998), Belgian footballer

See also 
 
 
 Mangalla, an alternative spelling of the South Sudan community Mongalla

Sinhalese masculine given names